Sirsi is a city in Uttara Kannada district of Karnataka state in India. It was also known as Kalyana Pattana during the Sonda Dynasty. It is a tourist destination with evergreen forest and waterfalls and is also a commercial centre. The main businesses around the city are mostly subsistence and agriculture-based. Areca nut or betel nut, locally known as Adike (also known as supari), is the primary crop grown in the nearby villages, making it one of the major trading centres for areca nut. The region is also known for spices such as cardamom, pepper, betel leaves, and vanilla. The major food crop is paddy.

Geography

It has an elevation ranging between 1860 feet to 2600 feet above sea level, and is situated in the heart of the Western Ghats.
River Aghanashini begins at a place near Sirsi called "shankara honda" and flows towards the Arabian Sea in the west. The river also creates many waterfalls along its path.

Climate
The climate in Sirsi is classified as Am (Tropical Monsoon Climate) and Af (Tropical Rainforest Climate) in fewer parts. Sirsi experiences pleasant weather all over the year. This town experiences about 25 days of hot days in a year. The hottest days are usually recorded in the months of March and April, which is the summer season in this region. The climate in Sirsi is strongly influenced by the monsoons, and the climate is tropical, moderated by proximity to the sea. During monsoons, the region receives one of the heaviest rainfall in Uttara Kannada district. As a result, the region also has a large variety of wildlife. The vegetation in the region is mainly moist deciduous, and valuable timber wood is commonly found in the forests of this region. Owing to the rich flora and fauna, deforestation and poaching have been causes for concern in recent years. Sirsi receives about 2500mm to 3500mm of rainfall annually. The climate of Sirsi is moderate and pleasant throughout the year with high humidity and day temperature usually stays warm.

Climate in Sirsi Taluk
Sampakhanda, Kakkali, Devimane Ghat, Bandla, Hebre are nearby and under Sirsi Taluk. Sampakhanda is the coldest place where the temperature would drop below  often during winter season and often drops below  even in summer season, and it had been recorded coldest not only in Uttara Kannada district but also as the coldest place among Karnataka especially during summer season.

Demographics

As of 2011, the population of Sirsi within town limits was 62,335. Males constituted 51% of the population and females 49%. Sirsi had an average literacy rate of 92.82%, which was much higher than the national average of 74.05%. Male literacy was 95.26%, and female literacy 90.43%. About 12% of the population was under 6 years of age. In Sirsi City Municipal Council, the female sex ratio was 1014, whereas the state average in Karnataka was 973.

Access

By Road
Sirsi is linked to other parts of the state many state highways. A couple of National Highways are sanctioned by the Ministry of Transport, Government of India passing through Sirsi namely Yellapur-Sirsi-Talguppa and Kumta-Sirsi-Haveri which will be developed and maintained by National Highways Authority of India (NHAI). Sirsi is linked to neighboring district headquarters of Dharwad, Mangalore, Udupi, Haveri, Belgaum and Shimoga. The state corporation has a network of buses to all major cities and towns in Karnataka, Maharashtra and Goa. VRL, SRS, Seabird, Shreekumar Travels, Durgamba Travels, Sri Durgamba Travels and Sugama Transport are the major private bus operators. Premium Volvo and Corona bus services are also available.

There are 3 mountain roads otherwise known as Ghat section are available to access Sirsi,
1. Devimane Ghat Road from Kumta via Katgal, Devimane, Amminali,
Total Number of Hairpin turn : 15
2. Vaddi Ghat Road  from Ankola via Achave, Yana Rock Mountain, Devanahalli,
Total Number of Hairpin turn : 21
3. Doddamane Ghat Road from Kumta via Mavingundi, Siddapura, Kansoor,
Total Number of Hairpin turn : 15

Some roads might be dangerous to access during monsoon seasons because of slippery conditions. But these are scenic routes during June, July, August, September, October months because of monsoon.

By Train
The nearest railhead is at Talguppa and Kumta. Talguppa railway connects Bengaluru city via Sagar, Karnataka. Kumta railway connects Kochi and Mumbai via Mangaluru and Karwar, respectively. The major railhead is Hubli, which is the Zonal Headquarters of South Western Railway zone.

By Air
The nearest airport is in Hubli, and the other is Belgaum, which are about 2.5 hrs and 5 hours drive from Sirsi respectively. Belgaum is connected to Bangalore, while Hubli is connected to Bangalore (direct – four flights daily), Mangalore (1 stop same equipment), Chennai (Direct), Jabalpur (1 stop same equipment) and Mumbai (direct – twice daily) by air. The nearest International Airport is Dabolim Airport, Goa.

Art and culture

Yakshagana is a classical dance drama common to the state of Karnataka mainly in the districts of Uttara Kannada, Shivamogga, Udupi, Dakshina Kannada and Kasaragod district of Kerala. There are several Yakshagana artists in and around Sirsi and it is being regularly played in Sirsi. Traditionally, Yakshaganas used to start late in the night and run entire night. Bhagavatha along with background musicians who play Chande and Maddale forms himmela. The actors who wear colorful costumes and enact various roles in the story forms Mummela. Yakshagana is sometimes simply called as Aataā in both Konkani and Kannada (meaning play). Yaksha-gana literally means the song (gana) of a Yaksha. Yakshas were an exotic tribe mentioned in the Sanskrit literature of ancient India.

In Sirsi, Holi is celebrated with a unique Carnival. Folk dance called "Bedara Vesha" is performed during the nights beginning five days before the actual festival day. The festival is celebrated every alternate year in the town which attracts a large crowd on all the five days from different parts of the India.

Dollu Kunitha is also another folk dance of Sirsi performed during Bedara Vesha and Marikamba Fair.

Sirsi Supari

Arecanut is extensively grown in this region. The arecanut grown in Sirsi has unique features like a round and flattened coin shape, particular texture, size, cross-sectional views, taste, etc. Its average dry weight is 7.5 g and average thickness is 16 mm. This unique arecanut has secured a GI tag.'

Budget information
The annual budget of the CMC Sirsi for the year 2021–22 is Rs.128.28 crores, out of which Rs.781.20 lakhs was proposed for capital expenses, Rs.462.45 lakhs towards proposed revenue payment, Rs.232.09 lakhs towards extra ordinary payment, and for development of SC&ST was Rs.9.86 lakhs.

Special and sweet dishes of Sirsi
 Todadevu is a special kind of thin-crust dosa made out of fresh sugarcane juice. (Most local desserts of Sirsi have Jaggery rather than sugar.)
 Kadubu: The main ingredients are Jackfruit pulp and Jaggery. The batter is prepared and, with additional ingredients, the batter is put into a container and steamed. The dessert is a local delicacy and is served hot with ghee butter.
 Karakali is a special kind of chutney which tastes very spicy. It is prepared from colocasia leaves.
Kesari is a special sweet prepared from special small aromatic rice Sannakki, saffron and ghee. It is generally prepared during marriage ceremonies.
Shunti Kaddi is a special sweet prepared from ginger paste and Jaggery, which is most popular during Sirsi Jathre.
Bendu Battasu is a special sweet which is available during Sirsi Jathre.

Religious places

Sirsi Marikamba Temple

Sirsi's Marikamba temple was built in 1688 and renovated at periodic intervals. The 'Marikamba Jaathre', commemorating the goddess Marikamba, is held by the temple authorities every alternate year. Nearly a lakh (100,000) Hindu devotees from all parts of the country attend the fair, making it one of the biggest festivals in South India.

Banavasi Madhukeshwara Temple

Banavasi is the oldest town in the Karnataka state. It has grown up around the Madhukeshwara Temple built in the 5th century and dedicated to Shiva the supreme God in Shaivism, a major branch of Hinduism.

Banavasi contains some of the oldest architectural monuments in southern India.

Shri Swarnavalli Maha Samsthana
Shree Matha is situated amidst evergreen forests near Shalmala river in Sirsi Taluk of Uttara Kannada district. Its history can be traced back to the period of Adi Shankaracharya who professed Advaita philosophy and established Mathas to propagate it. It is a famous religious center and includes 16 seemas in the Upperghat and several places in the Lowerghat and many more disciples across India. Havyaka Brahmins, Ramakshatriyas, Sheeligas, Siddhis, Marathis, Goulis, Bhandaris and Kunbis and many more are the traditional disciples of this matha.

Sodhe or Sonda or Swadi flourished during the Vijayanagara Empire and is a considered to be a sacred place by both Hindus and Jains.

Manjuguni Venkataramana Temple 
Manjuguni is one of the popular pilgrim centers located in the Uttara Kannada (North Kanara) district of Karnataka state. This place is located at a distance of 26 km from Sirsi. The temple here is dedicated to Lord Venkataramana and Goddess Padmavathi. Devotees believe that, Manjuguni is called as "Tirupati of karnataka". The temple is situated in western ghat belt, popularly known as Sahyadri hills. During winter, this place is covered by thick fog (in Kannada: Manju) and hence it is called by the name 'Manjuguni'. The temple of Lord Venkatramana is a huge complex built in Vijayanagara Style.

According to "Sri Venkatesha Mahatmya" the founder of this temple is 'Tirumala Yogi', a saint.

Jain Matha
A Jain Matha exists there, and it has been headed by Bhattaraka Swasti Sri Bhattakalanka. The Sonda Jain Matha is also known as the Swadi Jain Matha.

Churches 
St. Anthony's church is in Sirsi and is situated in the center of the town, and is the main church for the minority Christian population in the region. Another church is St. John Bosco Church situated on Hubli Road. Another church is Infant Jesus Church in Agasebagil. St.Paul's Mar Thoma Church is situated near the Zoo Circle.

Prominent places in and around the Taluk of Sirsi 
Banavasi, the capital of an ancient kingdom in Karnataka (state) ruled by the Kadamba Dynasty is 24 km away from the Sirsi town center. Banavasi is considered as the "first" capital of Karnataka state, with the current capital being Bangalore. Although most of the ancient grandeur of the dynasty in Banavasi has been lost, an ancient temple for Madhukeshwara (Lord Shiva) is still largely intact, and has been declared a monument of historical importance by the Archaeological Survey of India.
Sahasralinga (Sanskrit for a thousand Shiva (deity) lingas) is another place of significance, where Shiva's sculptures carved out of stones thousands of years ago can be found in the middle of a flowing river. The river is surrounded by lush green forest; the place is about 10 km from the town center. The place is quite secluded, except during "Maha Shivaratri" celebrations, when it receives a huge number of pilgrims from the surrounding areas.
Yana, known for the unusual rock formation.

Other destinations 

 Shivaganga Falls
 Burude Falls
 Benne Hole Falls
 Pancha Linga
 Ganesh Paalu
 Mattighatta Falls
 Waate Halla Falls
 Kumbri Gudda
 Dhoranagiri
 Musukina Bavi
 Manjaguni Devasthana
 Jog Falls
 Tapovan – a sacred place of Shri Vadiraja swami
 Banagere Falls
 Nishane Gudda
 Unchalli Falls
 Vibhuthi Falls
 Sathodi Falls
 Sahasralinga
 Magod Falls
 Bhimana Gudda
 Goli Siddivinayaka Temple
 Kashikalyana gudda Tuduguni
 Jenkal Gudda
 Chandragutti (Good for trekking)

Notable people from Sirsi
 Mayurasharma- Founder of Kadamba dynasty
 Adikavi Pampa- First Poet of Kannada
 Nandan Nilekani- an Indian entrepreneur
 Vishweshwar Hegde Kageri- Indian politician who is the 17th and current Speaker of the Karnataka Legislative Assembly, 6 term MLA of sirsi.
 Anant Kumar Hegde- Indian politician who was the former Union Minister of State for Skill Development and Entrepreneurship and the incumbent Member of Parliament for Uttara Kannada constituency.
 G. Devaraya Naik- He was elected as the MP to the Indian Parliament from Uttara Kannada (Canara) Constituency four times in 1980, 1984, 1989, and 1991.

References

External links

 [www.sirsicity.mrc.gov.in State Government website for Sirsi]

Cities and towns in Uttara Kannada district
Populated places in the Western Ghats
Tourism in Karnataka